Oakman is a surname. Notable people with the surname include:

Alan Oakman (1930–2018), English cricketer
Arthur A. Oakman (1905–1975), English Christian religious leader
Charles G. Oakman (1903–1973), American politician
Harry Oakman (1906–2002), Australian horticulturalist and writer
John Oakman (c.1748–1793), English engraver and writer
Wheeler Oakman (1890–1949), American actor

See also
Oakman, Georgia
Oakman-Hertel, a defunct American automobile company